Pietersfontein Dam is an arch type dam located on the Keisies River in Western Cape Province, South Africa. It was created in 1968 and serves mainly for irrigation purposes. Its hazard potential has been ranked high (3).

See also
List of reservoirs and dams in South Africa

References 

 List of South African Dams from the Department of Water Affairs

Dams in South Africa